Kırköy is a village in the Yayladere District, Bingöl Province, Turkey. The village is populated by Kurds of non-tribal affiliation and had a population of 20 in 2021.

Tha hamlet of Dede, Ekincik, Güreşli, Hamam, İncisu, Kapıbağı, Kaplancık, Sarıyer, Söğütloluk, Şeyh and Yiğitler are attached to the village.

References 

Villages in Yayladere District
Kurdish settlements in Bingöl Province